is a Japanese-born Indian former professional footballer who played as a midfielder. He is currently a youth coach with the Reliance Foundation Young Champs.

Izumi began his professional career in Singapore with Albirex Niigata Singapore and in his native Japan for Mitsubishi Mizushima before moving to India in 2006. He spent the first three years in India with East Bengal and Mahindra United before spending six seasons with Pune. He then went on to play for Atlético de Kolkata, Mumbai, Pune City, and NEROCA. With NEROCA, Izumi helped the Manipuri club earn promotion to the I-League. He then ended his career playing with the Kerala Blasters.

Izumi also represented India at international level, giving away his Japanese passport in order to do so. Izumi played nine matches for India between 2013 and 2014.

Club career

Albirex Niigata Singapore
In 2005, Izumi started his professional football career with Albirex Niigata Singapore of the S.League. Albirex Niigata Singapore was an affiliate of Albirex Niigata of the J.League. Arata grew a reputation for his speed while in the S.League. He scored his first professional goal of his career against Tampines Rovers in the S.League on 18 September 2005. He then scored his second goal of the season on 30 September 2005 against Woodlands Wellington. Arata ended the season with 22 caps in S.League with 3 goals and 2 caps in the Singapore Cup scoring 1 goal.

Mitsubishi Mizushima
In 2006, after a successful season with Albirex Niigata Singapore in which the team finished 5th in the S.League, Arata moved back to Japan and signed for Mitsubishi Motors Mizushima of the Japan Football League. While with the team Arata also worked for Mitsubishi Motors as a toso (a person of paints cars). He worked 10 hours a day from 5 in the morning to 6 in the evening with the car company and then he spent 2 hours practicing with the football team. Despite scoring 7 goals and gaining 7 assists in 24 games during the 2006 season Izumi could not stop the club finishing in 17th place, 2nd the last that season.

East Bengal
In November 2006 Izumi signed for East Bengal of the National Football League. At first he struggled to get accustomed to the Indian climate but eventually he found his way. He ended his maiden season with the club with 1 goal and 10 assists in 14 games.

Mahindra United
In 2007 Izumi signed for Mahindra United of the I-League, which replaced the old National Football League. He began the 2007–08 I-League campaign with an injury that kept him out of football for six months. He managed to come back that season, scoring 1 goal and getting 2 assists in 8 games. The next season Izumi scored 1 goal and gained 5 assists in 16 I-League games. That season Arata and Mahindra won the Durand Cup.

Pune
In 2009, Izumi signed for newly promoted I-League side Pune. Izumi has called his move to Pune as the turning point of his career. In 2010, he finished the season with a career high 10 goals and 10 assists in 26 games. He also scored an extra 6 goals in cup matches. He was the top goalscorer among all midfielders and was also nominated as the best midfielder in the I-League by goal.com. Izumi also won the Pune FC Man of Steel award from the club that season. Arata continued his good form for the club in 2010–11 scoring 6 goals and getting 9 assists in 24 games. On 22 October 2011 Izumi made his 50th appearance for the club in I-League in the opening match of the 2011–12 season against Shillong Lajong. On 24 August 2012 Izumi extended his contract by 2 years with Pune FC.

Atlético de Kolkata
In 2015 Izumi was drafted to Atlético Kolkata of the 2015 Indian Super League season. He started his campaign for the side with a goal against FC Goa in a high voltage 1-1 clash on 7 October. Six days latter on 13 October Izumi scored against Kerala Blasters in 2–1 win which was witnessed by a home crowd of sixty thousand Kolkata fans and legendary Pelé at Salt Lake Stadium. He returned after an injury almost a month latter and produced a match winning performance against Kerala Blasters in Kochi, coming off the bench and scoring twice on 84th and 90+3 minutes with his team winning the match 3–2. His last goal came in a 2–3 defeat on 14 December against Mumbai City FC at Salt Lake Stadium on the final match of the group stage.

NEROCA
In January 2017, after playing with Pune City, Izumi signed with I-League 2nd Division side NEROCA.

Kerala Blasters
On 23 July 2017, Izumi was selected in the 6th round of the 2017–18 ISL Players Draft by the Kerala Blasters for the 2017–18 Indian Super League season. He made his debut for the club during their opening match of the season on 17 November 2017 against ATK. He started and played the whole match as Kerala Blasters drew 0–0.

At the end of the season, Izumi announced his retirement from professional football on 18 July 2018.

Style of play

As player he can play anywhere on midfield and also as a False 9. Mostly Izumi likes to operate behind the striker or as a playmaker but also can play in as winger for his crossing abilities. Although, he has been criticized sometimes for lack of consistency throughout his career.

International career
On 24 August 2012, Izumi gained Indian citizenship, thus making him eligible to play for India at the international level. Then on 29 January 2013 it was confirmed that Izumi had been called up to Wim Koevermans side for the friendly against Palestine. Izumi then made his international debut in that match when he came on in the 64th minute for Lenny Rodrigues as India went on to lose the match 4–2.

Since then Izumi has also been called up to India's 2014 AFC Challenge Cup qualification squad and their 2013 SAFF Championship squad.

Coaching career
After retiring as a player, Izumi took up the role of youth coach with the Reliance Foundation Young Champs, the youth academy division for the Indian Super League.

Personal life
Arata was born to Akiko Izumi, a Japanese mother and Narendra Khambholja, a Gujarati father. On 24 August 2012, it was officially announced by his club, Pune FC, that he has received Indian citizenship from the Government of India. Izumi also holds an Indian name, Neelkanth Khambholja.

Career statistics

Club

Honours

India
 SAFF Championship runner-up: 2013

East Bengal
Indian Super Cup: 2006
Calcutta Football League: 2006

Mahindra United
IFA Shield: 2008
Mumbai Football League: 2007–08, 2008–09

Pune
I-League runner-up: 2012–13; third place: 2009–10
 Durand Cup runner-up: 2014
Bhutan King's Cup runner-up: 2014

See also
 List of Indian football players in foreign leagues
 Indian naturalized football players
 List of India international footballers born outside India

References

External links

 Indian Super League Profile

1982 births
Living people
People from Shimonoseki
Indian footballers
Japanese footballers
India international footballers
Indian expatriate footballers
Japanese expatriate footballers
Japanese people of Indian descent
Japanese emigrants to India
People with acquired Indian citizenship
Indian people of Japanese descent
Naturalised citizens of India
Singapore Premier League players
Albirex Niigata Singapore FC players
Expatriate footballers in Singapore
Association football midfielders
East Bengal Club players
Pune FC players
FC Pune City players
NEROCA FC players
Kerala Blasters FC players
Indian Super League players
I-League 2nd Division players
I-League players
Mahindra United FC players